His Private Life may refer to:

His Private Life (1926 film), American silent comedy short starring Lupino Lane
His Private Life (1928 film), American silent comedy starring Adolphe Menjou